Agua (released in the United Kingdom as Argentinian Waters) is a 2006 Argentine and French sports drama film directed and written by Verónica Chen and Pablo Lago. The film is centered on a former professional swimming champion returning to old glory in the sport.

Cast
 Rafael Ferro as Goyo
 Nicolás Mateo as Chino
 Jimena Anganuzzi as Luisa
 Leonora Balcarce as Ana
 Gloria Carrá as Maria
 Edith van Dijk as herself
 Diego Alonso Gómez as Jorge

Distribution
The drama premiered on April 21, 2006 in Argentina at the Buenos Aires International Festival of Independent Cinema, and opened wide in the country on September 21, 2006.

The picture was screened at various film festivals, including: the Locarno Film Festival, Switzerland; the Warsaw Film Festival, Poland; the Amiens International Film Festival, France; the Oslo International Film Festival, Norway; and others.

Critical reception
Robert Koehler, film critic for Variety magazine, gave the film a mixed review when reporting from the Buenos Aires Independent Film Festival.  He wrote, "Pretension swallows up Water, Veronica Chen's shallow follow-up to her fine 2001 debut, Smokers Only. Bookended by a hauntingly atmospheric opening sequence and a finale that makes the central characters' involvement with marathon swimming vivid and physical, the pic has a gaping hole in the middle. Hardly different in basic outline from innumerable recent sports films about outsiders and underdogs turning their lives around, the pic's only twist is an excessively and pointlessly elliptical storytelling gambit. Fest interest will be mild at best for a film with little commercial kick."

Awards
Wins
 Amiens International Film Festival, France: SIGNIS Award, Best Film, Verónica Chen; 2006.
 Locarno International Film Festival, Switzerland: Prize of the Ecumenical Jury, Verónica Chen; Youth Jury Award: Environment is Quality of Life, Verónica Chen; 2006.
 Argentine Film Critics Association Awards: Silver Condor, Best Sound, Martín Grignaschi and Federico Billordo; 2007.
 Málaga Spanish Film Festival, Spain: Silver Biznaga, Best Film, Verónica Chen; 2007.
 Palm Springs International Film Festival: New Voices/New Visions Special Jury Prize, Best Film, Verónica Chen; 2007.

Nominations
 Locarno International Film Festival: Golden Leopard, Verónica Chen; 2006.
 Marrakech International Film Festival, Morocco: Golden Star, Verónica Chen; 2006.
 Oslo Films from the South Festival: Films from the South Award, Best Feature, Verónica Chen; 2006.
 Argentine Film Critics Association Awards: Silver Condor, Best Cinematography, Sabine Lancelin and Matías Mesa; 2007.

References

External links
 
 Agua at the cinenacional.com 

2006 films
2000s sports drama films
Argentine independent films
2000s Spanish-language films
Swimming films
French independent films
2006 independent films
Argentine sports drama films
French sports drama films
2006 drama films
2000s French films
2000s Argentine films